Pupoidopsis hawaiensis is a species of very small or minute air-breathing land snail, a terrestrial pulmonate gastropod mollusk or micromollusk in the family Pupillidae.

This species is endemic to the Hawaii.

References

Pupillidae
Molluscs of Hawaii
Gastropods described in 1920
Taxonomy articles created by Polbot